Cottonwood Mountains  may refer to:

 Cottonwood Mountains (Arizona), Arizona, USA
 Cottonwood Mountains (Inyo County), California, USA
 Cottonwood Mountains (Lassen County), California, USA
 Cottonwood Mountains (Riverside County), California, USA